Karma Ke Rati is a 2013 Assamese-Sadri film by Jayanta Nath on Tea-garden community of Assam. The movie evolves around an incident happened in the annual Karam (festival) celebrated by the Tea-garden community of Assam.

Plot 
The movie is set mostly in a tea estate of Sepon, Assam. An Ideal teacher "Sagar", who leads a group of youth to fight against corrupted officials through education is the main plot of the film. Film also features a Jhumair song, the main attraction of Karam (festival) in which the climax took place.

Cast 

 Lobin Das as Sagar Mastar
 Aimee Baruah as Laxmi Nayak
 Rajkumar Aryan as Suresh Nayak
 Rimpi Das as Papori
 Prince Chauhan as David
 Trishna Kurmi as Marry
Bishnu Kharghoria as Mr. Baruah
 Podmaraag Goswami as Robin

Soundtrack 

One of the song is a traditional Jhumair song in Sadri language.

Awards 
The film awarded with "Best Film other than Asaamese" in Prag Cine Awards 2014 and Moonlight Media Award for "Best Music Director".

See also 

 Jollywood
 Prag Cine Awards 2014

References

External links 

 
 Karma Ke Rati on YouTube

2013 films
2010s Assamese-language films
Nagpuri-language films